David Stergakos (born October 24, 1956) is an American retired professional basketball player and basketball coach. At a height of 6 ft 9 in (2.06 m), he played at both the power forward and center positions.

College career
Stergakos played college basketball under the name David Nelson, at a small college in New Jersey, Bloomfield College.

Professional playing career
Stergakos was selected by the Boston Celtics, in the 4th round of the 1978 NBA Draft, with the 72nd overall draft pick. He was the first Greek player ever selected by an NBA team. However, he never played as a professional in the NBA.

A year later, in 1979, he moved to Panathinaikos, in Greece. He is one of the greatest players in Panathinaikos history, as he won 4 Greek League championships (1980, 1981, 1982, 1984), and 4 Greek Cups (1979, 1982, 1983, 1986). He was also a Greek Cup finalist in 1985. He was the Greek Cup Finals Top Scorer in 1986. In the 1987–88 season, he was the top rebounder in the Greek League, with an average of 12.2 rebounds per game.

National team career
Stergakos was an important member of the senior men's Greek national basketball team that won the silver medal at EuroBasket 1989. He was also a member of the Greek national team that finished in 6th place at the 1990 FIBA World Championship.

Coaching and managing career
After his playing career ended, Stergakos went into coaching, and then became a club general manager. Stergakos coached Milon and Papagou, and he managed AEK, Panathinaikos, and Maroussi.

References

External links 
FIBA Archive Profile
FIBA Europe Profile
Hellenic Basketball Federation Profile 

1956 births
Living people
American men's basketball players
American people of Greek descent
Bloomfield Bears men's basketball players
Boston Celtics draft picks
Centers (basketball)
Greek basketball coaches
Greek Basket League players
Greek men's basketball players
1990 FIBA World Championship players
Milon B.C. coaches
Panathinaikos B.C. players
Papagou B.C. coaches
Power forwards (basketball)
Basketball players from Kansas City, Missouri